Sakākā is a city in northwestern Saudi Arabia which is the capital of Al Jawf Province. It is located just to the north of the An Nafud desert. Sakakah had a population of 242,813 at the 2010 census.

History
Sakakah is an oasis town on an ancient caravan route across the Arabian peninsula.

Modernization
In recent years, the Saudi government has been providing more seed capital to Al-Jawf region, especially in Sakaka in hopes of developing the economically starved region of the kingdom. For this reason, the city has new government buildings, schools and hospitals and are built adjacent to crumbling ruins of older buildings. One major feature of the city is the rapidly expanding Al Jouf University (Jami'at Al-Jawf), founded in 2005. Sakaka is a small but expanding city with much construction in progress.It has 3 major Hospitals as on date King abdul aziz Specialist Hospital Prince mutaib Hospital .And child and maternity care hospital.There is a newly established Oncology Center and a Cardiac Center as well with highly qualified Physicians A big ongoing project is the 1,000-bed Prince Muhammed Bin Abdulaziz Medical City which is under construction.

Education
The King hopes that Al Jouf University will become a pillar of social, cultural, and intellectual advancement in Saudi Arabia. There are several government-run schools and some private schools. The city has three English schools, Sakaka International School, which is an international, mostly Egyptian School and has an American curriculum, the other Al-Jouf International school with British curriculum and the third one is Alqimam international school with American curriculum.

Transportation
The city is served by Al-Jawf Airport which has domestic flights and International flights to some of the major cities in the Middle East.Saudi Arabian Railways has introduced Railway track in the region which connects Aljouf with Riyadh.SAR has the most luxerious Seating arrangements for diff categories.SAPTCO is an another means of transport which connects all major cities with Aljouf.

Agriculture
Al-Jawf is notable for its abundant agricultural water, making possible the cultivation of dates (200,000 palms) and olives (12,000,000 trees), as well as other agricultural products. Farms number around 16,000, and agricultural projects around 1,500. It is the home to agribusiness farms such as Watania Farms, the largest organic farm in the kingdom. The fertile agricultural land of Al-Jawf is due largely to underground water, which drew delegates of King Abdul Aziz. They were sent to the town of Sakaka and Dumat Al-Jandal and Qurayat, requesting resident tribes there to join the nascent kingdom. Sakaka is home to many Saudi families that can proudly trace their lineage to a few large, old tribes that have dominated the area since time immemorial.

Historical places

The history of Al-Jawf dates back more than four thousand years. It is the home of many historic & prehistoric archaeological sites such Za'bal Castle & Well, the Omar ibn Al-Khattab Mosque, located in Dowmat Al-Jandal and Mard Castle (just south of Sakaka). There are also the ancient Rajajil standing stones in Sakaka, dating back nearly 6,000 years.

Climate
The Köppen-Geiger climate classification system classifies its climate as hot desert (BWh).

See also 

List of cities and towns in Saudi Arabia
Sirhan Valley

References

External links
A travel through the province of Al Jouf, Splendid Arabia: A travel site with photos and routes
Rajajeel – Saudi Arabia's Stonehenge, nearby

Populated places in Al-Jawf Province
Geography of Saudi Arabia
Provincial capitals of Saudi Arabia